The Ford Falcon (XC) is a full-size car that was produced by Ford Australia from 1976 to 1979. It was the third and last iteration of the third generation of the Falcon and also included the Ford Fairmont (XC)—the luxury-oriented version of the Falcon.

Overview
The XC series was a facelift of the XB Falcon, itself an upgrade of the XA Falcon which had entered production in 1972.  Introduced in July 1976, the XC was the first model to comply with the new pollution regulations specified under Australian Design Rule 27A. The response to the 1 July 1976, mandatory anti-pollution laws (ADR 27A), was to redevelop the Falcon six cylinder engines with a cross-flow head for greater efficiency.

Visually, the XC Falcon was given a restyle treatment. The XC had a less aggressive nose which incorporated two round headlights on Falcon models and two rectangular headlights on Fairmont models. Ford also addressed the vision problems of the XA and XB by utilizing the rear doors from the contemporary model FAIRLANE which had the  effect of removing the coke bottle look.,  along with installing an all-new dash and installing higher front seats. The preceding XA and XB series  were the last model Falcons to use coke bottle styling. It was succeeded in 1979 by  the XD Falcon which utilised similar styling to Ford's European Granada models.

Total production of the XC range reached 171,082 vehicles  prior to the replacement of the XC by the XD Falcon in March 1979.

Model range 
The XC Falcon range of passenger vehicles consisted of nine models:

The Fairmont models were not badged or marketed as Falcons.

The XC Falcon range of commercial vehicles consisted of five models:

The contemporary Fairlane and LTD models were codenamed ZH, and P6 respectively.

Fairmont GXL

Unique to the XC model was the GXL version of the Fairmont, Available in 4.1L Straight 6, or 4.9L Cleveland V8. An upgraded engine package, the GT Power Pack, used the larger 5.8L Cleveland v8. The Fairmont GXL was replaced in the following XD range with the Fairmont Ghia model.

GS Rally Pack

A GS Rally Pack was fitted as standard equipment on the Falcon GS Hardtop  and was available as an option on Falcon 500 Sedan and Wagon, Fairmont Sedan and Wagon, Falcon Utility and Van  and on Falcon 500 Utility and Van. The pack included special paint treatment, bonnet scoops, bumper overriders, slotted steel wheels, enhanced instrumentation, a sports steering wheel and long range driving lights. The driving lights were not included when the pack was fitted to Fairmont models.

Limited edition models
In December 1977 12 special-build XC hardtops were released, all with VINs beginning JG65TE. These were based on the GS hardtop but featured an homologation pack of additional parts that Ford persuaded CAMS was now available as standard on GS hardtops, in order to include those parts on their race cars. The pack included front and rear spoilers, twin electric radiator fans, various body and steering braces for durability and stiffness, and a reverse bonnet scoop that supplied cool air to the engine via a circular hole in the bonnet. This homologation pack would also form the basis of the 30 Option 97 "Bathurst Cobras" the following year.

Ford Falcon Cobra

In August 1978 Ford Australia introduced the limited production Falcon Cobra, a high-performance version of the XC Falcon Hardtop. Only 400 were built, including 4.9-litre and 5.8-litre street versions and 30 "Bathurst Specials".

Allan Moffat Special

In 1977 a limited number (500) of the Falcon 500 sedan were marketed as Allan Moffat Specials. These cars received XB GT-style blackouts and a sticker on the front doors consisting of Allan Moffat's signature and an Australian flag, as well as other options such as the GS Rally pack and Sports handling suspension as standard. 

Sundowner Van

The Falcon Sundowner Van, based on the Falcon 500 Van, was introduced in 1977. It included options from the Falcon GS Hardtop, such as comprehensive instrumentation, bonnet scoops, slotted sports road wheels and driving lights, with side protection moulding's and rear side glass deleted. Side and rear decals were included in the package.

Motorsport

The GS 500 Hardtop formed the basis for the Ford Falcon Cobra and a customer racing program, with a special "Evolution" (and later Evo II) package to homologate parts. At the 1977 Hardie-Ferodo 1000, Allan Moffat and Colin Bond drove Group C specification Hardtops to a "1, 2" formation finish. Moffat later went on to win the 1977 Australian Touring Car Championship driving both an XB Falcon GT Hardtop and XC Falcon GS 500 Hardtop.

References

External links
 The Old Car Manual Project - Ford Cars All Model Catalogue May 1978

XC
Cars of Australia
Cars introduced in 1976
1970s cars
XC Falcon
Sedans
Station wagons
Coupé utilities
Vans
Rear-wheel-drive vehicles